San Francisco de Yojoa is a municipality in the Honduran department of Cortés. Its religious composition is majority Christian, with a lesser presence of Christian Evangelics.

The town is located in the region around Lake Yojoa.

References

Municipalities of the Cortés Department